The following is a list of flying aces from the United States of America who served in World War I

Overview

Even before the United States entry into World War I in April 1917, many Americans volunteered to serve in the armed forces of Great Britain and France. Many eventually found their ways into the Royal Flying Corps and Aéronautique Militaire (French Air Service). The British integrated the Americans into their existing squadrons, while the French set up separate American squadrons such as the Lafayette Escadrille and then the Lafayette Flying Corps, as well as integrated the pilots into existing squadrons.

When American Air Service units began reaching England and France in the fall of 1917, many of the Americans serving in British and French squadrons transferred to the American units, but not all. This list is separated such that American pilots who served in the Royal Flying Corps (later Royal Air Force) squadrons and Aéronautique Militaire are listed as such, while those who served only in the Air Service, United States Army Aero Squadrons are listed separately. Known American air aces that chose to remain with their British or French squadrons are also listed.

The British and French documented aerial victories in different ways. The British decided early in the war that since the majority of air combat occurred behind enemy lines, confirmation of aerial victories would be made by witnesses mostly in the front line trenches. If an aircraft was seen going down "out of control", then the pilot would be given credit for a victory as it was presumed the plane crashed in enemy territory.

The French implemented a strict system of victories being confirmed by independent observers, and an enemy plane had to be seen to fall in flames and crash; or be destroyed in the air. Unconfirmed victories were also noted if the enemy plane was seen to spin out of control but the final end was not observed. These unconfirmed victories were noted, but not included in a pilots score.

The Americans generally used the French rules of scoring aerial victories with the exception of the 17th and 148th Aero Squadrons, which were under British control until October, 1918. The pilots flying in those squadrons were scored under British rules. "Shared" victories were noted when two or more pilots attacked an enemy plane, and it could not be determined precisely which pilot shot down the aircraft.

Air aces
Pilots who scored five or more aerial victories were classified as "air aces". The lists below show the names; military rank; units in which they served, and miscellaneous notes along with the known decorations which they received.

Served with the Aéronautique Militaire

Served with the Royal Flying Corps (later Royal Air Force)

Served with the Air Service, United States Army

See also
 Aerial victory standards of World War I

References

Bibliography

External links

 
United States Army officers